Robbery Under Arms is a 1920 Australian film directed by Kenneth Brampton and financed by mining magnate Pearson Tewksbury. It is an early example of the "Meat pie Western".

Plot
Two brothers, Dick and Jim Marsden, become involved with the bushranger, Captain Starlight. They romance two girls, work on the goldfields, and are captured by the police after Starlight is shot dead.

Cast

 Kenneth Brampton as Captain Starlight
 S. A. Fitzgerald as Ben Marsden
 Roland Conway as Dick Marsden
 Cliff Pyatt as Jim Marsden
 Roy Redgrave as Dan Moran
 William Pearson as Sir Frederick Moranger
 Stuart MacRae as Inspector Goring
 Jackie Anderson as Warrigal
 Vera Archer as Jennie Morrison
 Betty Crook as Miss Falkland
 Hilda Dorrington as Kate Morrison
 Tien Hogue as Aileen Marsden
 Austral Nichol as Mrs. Knightley
 Wilton Power as George Storefield
 Phyllis Ruthven as Grace Storefield
 Sybil Shirley
 Nan Taylor as Mrs. Marsden
 H. D. Wise as Mr. Knightley
 Charles Chauvel

Production
There had been several attempts to make films based on Rolfe Boldrewood's 1888 novel since the bushranging ban by the New South Wales government in 1912. In particular there were attempts by Stanley Crick in 1916 and Alfred Rolfe in 1918. However Kenneth Brampton managed to secure permission for this 1920 version, mostly likely because it stressed the moral lessons of the story.

Kenneth Brampton and actress Tien Hogue managed to persuade the mining magnate Pearson Tewksbury to raise the budget and act as producer.

Brampton was acting in the play Lightnin''' which he left to make the film.

The film was shot on location at Braidwood and in the Araluen Valley near Canberra. The bushrangers the Clarke brothers reportedly worked in this region.

Renowned horseman "Top" Hassall doubled for Brampton on the horse riding scenes.

Future director Charles Chauvel was working around the Sydney studios and attending to horses on the film. He has a bit part.

The film was the final acting role for Roy Redgrave who died in 1922.

Reception
The movie was reportedly successful at the box office and grossed up to £16,000. However returns were so slow and the distributor and exhibitor took so much that Pearson Tewksbury was dissuaded from further film production.Variety'' said the film was "of only fair quality, the picture just gets by."

Preservation status
A "copy comprising about three-quarters of the film" was found and combined with already known footage to produce a near-complete version. A five-minute sequence is still missing.

References

External links
 
 
 Robbery Under Arms (1920) at National Film and Sound Archive

1920 films
1920 Western (genre) films
1920s rediscovered films
Articles containing video clips
Australian black-and-white films
Films based on Robbery Under Arms
Rediscovered Australian films
Silent Australian Western (genre) films
Silent drama films